Camp Ground Methodist Church is a historic Methodist church on Camp Ground Road in Fayetteville, Cumberland County, North Carolina. It was built between 1858 and 1862, and is a two-story, four bay by five bay, gable-end frame building with double front entrances in the vernacular Greek Revival style. The site was originally originally used for seasonal camp meetings but the building served as a permanent home for a congregation. The building was moved back from the road to make room for the new church building.

It was listed on the National Register of Historic Places in 1983.

References

Churches in Fayetteville, North Carolina
United Methodist churches in North Carolina
Churches on the National Register of Historic Places in North Carolina
Greek Revival church buildings in North Carolina
Churches completed in 1862
19th-century Methodist church buildings in the United States
National Register of Historic Places in Cumberland County, North Carolina
Wooden churches in North Carolina
1862 establishments in North Carolina
Relocated buildings and structures in North Carolina